The Mystery of the Third Planet (Tayna tretyey planety), aka The Secret of the Third Planet is a 1981 Soviet traditionally animated feature film directed by Roman Kachanov and produced by the Soyuzmultfilm studio in Moscow. It is based on a children's science fiction novella "Alice's Travel" by Kir Bulychev, from Alisa (Alice) Selezneva book series.

The movie is considered a cult classic in Russia and was included in various lists of the best animated films and science fiction films. A shortened novelization of the film was written by Bulychev himself; a diafilm and a number of video games were based on The Mystery of the Third Planet; and spiritual successor film Alice's Birthday was released in 2009.

Plot 
Captain Zelyony, Professor Seleznyov and his daughter Alisa Selezneva set out from Earth aboard the Pegas (Pegasus) starship, seeking out new animal species for the Moscow Zoo. Visiting the Moon as a resting point, Seleznyov meets his friend, Gromozeka the alien archaeologist, who advises him to turn to the Planet of Two Captains, a huge museum dedicated to Captains Kim and Buran who went around the whole universe on their ship, the Blue Seagull, for useful information on where the rare animals live. Doctor Verkhovtsev, the director of the museum, is seen visiting the moon as well; however, he avoids Gromozeka.

On the Planet of two Captains, the heroes meet Verkhovtsev and ask him to show them the Captain's diaries for directions to find rare animals. But the doctor behaves suspiciously: he refuses to show them the diaries and starts spying on the expedition.

Visiting the planet Bluk, the heroes make some valuable purchases, and found out about Chatterbirds — a special kind of birds who could imitate human speech and fly in open space. The heroes found out that they went extinct, and the one responsible for their extinction was no one else that Doctor Verkhovtsev. Later, Alisa and Seleznyov spot the Doctor himself on the planet, but an unknown fat alien encounters them and dismisses their claims. A secretive local person, having heard about the heroes' intentions to find a Chatterbird, tells them that he once saved an injured Chatterbird and refused to give it away to the man suspiciously similar to the Doctor. Since he's too afraid to keep the Chatterbird for now, he gives it to the heroes for free. On the way back to the ship, the heroes are ambushed, but manage to defeat their opponents. The fat alien, named Jolly Man U, appears as well; he gifts a diamond-shelled tortoise to the heroes and attempts to get the Chatterbird, but to no avail.

Soon the bird in question starts talking, and it is found out that it belongs to the captain Kim, who apparently went missing. Having listened to the speech of the Chatterbird, the Pegas crew heads for the Medusa system. On the road, the heroes get a SOS signal from the planet Shelezyaka, a planet that is populated only by robots, who recently started malfunctioning. It is then revealed that the robots once helped the Chatterbird as well, and also that the Doctor visited the planet as well and found out about this. All the malfunctioning happened shortly after the Doctor left off: as a revenge, he put diamond dust into the grease that the robots used.

Exploring the three-planet Medusa system, the heroes pass the inhospitable first planet and find mirage-projecting stones at the second planet, who depict the Blue Seagull — a spaceship of Captains Kim and Buran. On the third planet, however, the heroes experience some adventures with the local flora and fauna, and get some clues that the Blue Seagull can be somewhere there. Later, Alisa finds strange mirror-like flowers. After the heroes transport them to the Pegas, they found out that the flowers had been recording everything that was happening in front of them, and upon being picked up, they started deteriorating and depicting what they recorded in reverse. Watching the flowers, the heroes find out that both Verkhovtsev and Jolly Man U were on the planet, and they were cooperating as space pirates. Pretty soon, the tortoise destroys the flowers, and Zelyony finds out that the tortoise actually was a spying device that helped the pirates to track down the heroes. In attempt to fly in a safe place, Pegas falls in a trap. Seleznyov and Zelyony are captured by Verkhovtsev and Jolly Man U, while Alisa manages to escape. She then finds out that Captain Buran also landed on the planet — together with Doctor Verkhovtsev, but, apparently, not the same one who trapped her comrades.

The Blue Seagull appears to have been caught in the same trap that Pegas landed in. It is then revealed that Captain Kim was trapped in his spaceship by pirates, who wanted to get his formula of absolute fuel. However, after the pirates took heroes as hostages and threaten to murder them, Kim, not having the strength to hold in anymore, exits the ship, encounters and disarms the pirates on his own. Pretty soon, Buran and the other Doctor Verkhovtsev arrive and help him, and the pirates get clearly outmatched. With two Verkhovtsevs being at the same place now, one of them exposes the other one as Glot the space pirate (who immediately attempts suicide, but is exposed by Jolly Man U just to be feigning death), reveals that Glot posing as him was the one responsible for all the crimes, and confesses that Glot and Jolly Man U's previous interest in the Captains' diaries made him suspect the heroes back at the museum. Buran also points out that the Chatterbird's previous owner, knowing the bird's lines about the Medusa system, was the one who directed him and the real Verkhovtsev there.

After everything is settled down, the heroes make Jolly Man U open the trap and capture him and Glot. With the commotion around Gromozeka suddenly appearing late to the call to save the day, Jolly Man escapes, but is captured by a local bird of prey and carried away to the nest. In the end, the captains and the Doctor take away from the planet, and the main protagonists are returning to Earth with captured Glot and with the animals they collected.

Creators

International broadcast

Home video and English adaptations 
The film was adapted twice for the US market. It was first brought over as a video release in 1987, with dubbed voices. The second time, it was released in the 1990s as part of Mikhail Baryshnikov's Stories from My Childhood series. This series consisted of films that were bought by California-based company Films by Jove from Soyuzmultfilm for the international market. Over $1.5 million was spent by this company restoring the prints, adding new music and redubbing the films with American actors. This version of the film was named Alice and the Mystery of the Third Planet and has been released on VHS as well as on a 1999 DVD collection with several other films . The film has been released on DVD several times (the latest release, which featured rather misleading cover art, was in October 2005 ). The original Russian version with English subtitles is here: 

The Films by Jove version of the film has been criticized by some of those who saw the original for adding many extra dialogue lines, shortening the film, and replacing the unique synthesizer music by Alexander Zatsepin.

The original film has been released on several DVD editions in Russia, including a newly restored one by Krupnyy Plan.

Awards
1982 — USSR State Prize

Games
 In 2005 an arcade platform game was made by the company Akella based on the film, called "Alice's Space Adventure".
 An adventure game was released in the same year called "Alice's Journey", also produced by Akella (but developed by "Step Creative Group").

Shootings
This was the fourth film using traditional drawn animation directed by Roman Kachanov, who served as the art director and/or animator on over 30 animated movies. Kachanov's best-known works, (The Mitten, Gena the Crocodile, Cheburashka, Shapoklyak and others) were shot in stop motion (volume) animation.

The characters were designed by Natalya Orlova. Her daughter, the actress Ekaterina Semyonova, said that Alice was based on her, and her father, (the director Tengiz Semyonov), was the prototype for Captain Zelyonyy.

Music for the movie was written by Aleksandr Zatsepin. According to Zatsepin, original records of music in his record library didn't remain.

The production of this picture took four years.

International release 
The animated film was twice released in the USA. The first dubbing, ("Mystery of the Third Planet"), came out on video in 1987. Alice's name was changed to Christine, and overall the translation had little in common with the original. Consequently, this legally-sourced version is often mistaken for a bootlegged edition.

The second version, ("Alice and the Mystery of the Third Planet"), was released in the 1990s by the Films by Jove company. In this version, the translation is much closer to the original, though a large amount of dialogue which was not in the original was also added. In this version, the soundtrack was replaced and about 6 minutes were cut out. Kirsten Dunst was the voice of Alice, and Jim Belushi — the Chatterer.

"Alice and the Mystery of the Third Planet" was released in English, Spanish, French, Finnish and other languages.

See also

Guest from the Future
History of Russian animation
List of animated feature films of 1981
Alice's Birthday, a 2009 spiritual successor animated film based on another one of the Alice stories

References

External links

 
 (English adaptation)
VObzor review of the Krupnyy Plan DVD (with screenshots)
The Mystery of the Third Planet at myltik.ru

Games
 Official website of Alice's Space Adventure (platform game)
 Official website of Alice's Journey (adventure game) (click on first link for English version of official website)

Russian and Soviet animated science fiction films
Films by Vladimir Tarasov
Films based on works by Kir Bulychov
Films directed by Roman Abelevich Kachanov
1981 animated films
1981 films
1981 in the Soviet Union
Space adventure films
Space opera films
Space pirates
1980s Russian-language films
Films scored by Aleksandr Zatsepin
Films set in the 22nd century
Films set on fictional planets
Fiction set in the 2180s
Soyuzmultfilm
Films about astronauts